Gerard Francis Loft (6 April 1933 − 4 February 2007) was a New Zealand Roman Catholic bishop.

Ordained to the priesthood on 20 July 1958, Loft was named bishop of the Roman Catholic Diocese of Auki, Solomon Islands in 1983 and resigned in 2004.

References 

1933 births
2007 deaths
People from Wellington City
Roman Catholic bishops in the Solomon Islands
20th-century Roman Catholic bishops in New Zealand
20th-century Roman Catholic bishops in Oceania
Roman Catholic bishops of Auki
New Zealand expatriates in the Solomon Islands
Expatriate bishops